Lee Toland Krieger (born January 24, 1983) is an American film director and screenwriter best known for the films The Vicious Kind (2009), Celeste and Jesse Forever (2012) and The Age of Adaline (2015).

Early life
Krieger was born and raised in Los Angeles. He became "hooked" on filmmaking at the age of 13 when his neighbor, film producer Steve Perry, brought him to the set of the 1996 film Executive Decision. Krieger later interned for Perry during high school, and in college he worked for Neil LaBute and his producing partner Gail Mutrux. He graduated from the University of Southern California's School of Cinema and Television in 2005.

Career
Krieger founded a production company, Autumn Entertainment, in 2004, under which his first project was December Ends, a feature film shot on a US$75,000 budget. The film premiered at the 2006 Method Fest, two years after it was shot, where it won the festival's Best Picture award.

In 2009, Krieger wrote and directed The Vicious Kind, which premiered at the 2009 Sundance Film Festival and earned him numerous accolades including the Emerging Filmmaker Award at the Denver Film Festival and an Independent Spirit Award nomination for Best Screenplay. He was later asked by producer Jennifer Todd to direct Celeste and Jesse Forever, based on a script written by Rashida Jones and Will McCormack, which would also premiere at the Sundance Film Festival in 2012. After the success of Celeste and Jesse Forever, he received offers to direct similar scripts, but turned them down in lieu of writing his own material for future projects.

He has also directed many commercials with clients such as Joseph Abboud and AG Jeans, and music videos for Universal Music Group and the Island Def Jam Music Group.

He directed The Age of Adaline, starring Blake Lively and Michiel Huisman. Production started in March 2014, and the film was released in April 2015.

In September 19, 2012, Lionsgate acquired the rights to the script Vanish Man written by Denison Hatch. Later in February 2015, Krieger was set to rewrite and direct the film, which 21 Laps Entertainment would produce.

On February 29, 2016, it was announced that Krieger would direct The Divergent Series: Ascendant, the final film in The Divergent Series. On July 20, 2016, it was announced that the project was put on hold due to Lionsgate's decision to release the final film as a TV movie, mainly because of the third film in the series, Allegiant, underperforming. In December 2018, it was announced that the television movie has been cancelled due to the lack of interest of the cast and network executives.

On May 27, 2021, it was announced that Krieger would direct the first two episodes of the show Lanterns for HBO Max.

Personal life
Krieger currently lives in Los Angeles. He is the grandson of actor Lee Krieger.

Filmography
Films

Short films

Television

References

External links

Living people
1983 births
American male screenwriters
Writers from Los Angeles
USC School of Cinematic Arts alumni
Film directors from Los Angeles
Screenwriters from California